Associazione Sportiva Dilettantistica Sanvitese is an Italian association football club located in San Vito al Tagliamento, Friuli-Venezia Giulia. It currently plays in Eccellenza

History
The club was founded in 1920.

In the 1993–94 season the club was promoted to Serie D where it currently plays for the 19th year consecutive.

Colors and badge 
The colors of the team are red and white.

References 

Football clubs in Italy
Association football clubs established in 1920
Football clubs in Friuli-Venezia Giulia
1920 establishments in Italy
San Vito al Tagliamento